The Sun Country PGA Championship is a golf championship for the Sun Country section of the PGA of America. This section was founded in 1974 by Guy Wimberly, and encompasses New Mexico and western Texas. The Sun Country tournament started in 1961, when it was a chapter of the Southwest section. 

Don Klein of Four Hills Country Club in Albuquerque, New Mexico was the first to win the tournament. Klein still holds the record for most victories, having won six consecutive championships between 1961-1966 and another in 1968. Former PGA Tour professional, Tim Norris, winner of the 1982 Sammy Davis Jr.-Greater Hartford Open, won the 1992 championship. 

The Sun Country Section PGA was established in 1974 as one of the 41 sections that make up the Professional Golfers Association. The Section (consisting of the state of New Mexico and El Paso County, Texas) currently has 136 PGA members and 55 PGA apprentices.

Winners 

 1961 Don Klein
 1962 Don Klein
 1963 Don Klein
 1964 Don Klein
 1965 Don Klein
 1966 Don Klein
 1967 Iverson Martin
 1968 Don Klein
 1969 Bill Eschenbrenner
 1970 Gene Torres
 1971 Gene Torres
 1972 Bob Meiering
 1973 Don McDaniel
 1974 Gene Torres
 1975 Darrell Hickock
 1976 Robert Atkins
 1977 Woody Dame
 1978 Gene Torres
 1979 Woody Dame
 1980 Bill Peterson
 1981 Jim Dickson
 1982 Gene Torres
 1983 Gene Torres
 1984 Mark Pelletier
 1985 Jim Dickson
 1986 Terry Jennings
 1987 Jim Dickson
 1988 Jim Dickson
 1989 Ray Cragun
 1990 Dan Koesters
 1991 Mike Putnam
 1992 Tim Norris
 1993 Ray Cragun
 1994 Ray Cragun
 1995 Jim Dickson
 1996 Mike Putnam
 1997 Cameron Doan
 1998 Cameron Doan
 1999 Cameron Doan
 2000 Dan Koesters
 2001 Dan Koesters
 2002 Bill Hancock
 2003 Bill Harvey
 2004 Kurt Osborn
 2005 Scott Gates
 2006 Bill Harvey
 2007 Bill Harvey
 2008 Mark Pelletier
 2009 Scott Gates
 2010 Scott Lieberwirth
 2011 Trent Romman
 2012 David Muttitt
 2013 David Muttitt
 2014 Scott Gates
 2015 David Muttitt
 2016 Brad Lardon
 2017 Jeff Roth
 2018 David Muttitt
 2019 David Muttitt
 2020 Jordan Gibbs
 2021 Jordan Gibbs
 2022 Brad Lardon

References

External links 
PGA of America – Sun Country section

Golf in New Mexico
Golf in Texas
PGA of America sectional tournaments
Recurring sporting events established in 1961